Caladenia alpina, commonly known as the mountain caladenia, is a plant in the orchid family Orchidaceae and is native to subalpine areas of south-eastern Australia and to New Zealand. It has a single fleshy leaf and a thin wiry flowering spike bearing two white flowers with red bars on the labellum. In New Zealand this orchid is sometimes known as Caladenia lyallii.

Description
The leaf is thick and fleshy and green to dark reddish-green.

There are four well-spaced rows of calli on the surface of the labellum. The calli are club-shaped, yellow or whitish becoming darker and shorter towards the tip of the labellum.

Taxonomy and naming
Caladenia alpina was first formally described by Richard Sanders Rogers in 1927 and the description was published in Transactions and Proceedings of the Royal Society of South Australia. Rogers described the species from specimens collected on Mount Bogong and Mount Hotham in Victoria and from Mount Kosciuszko in New South Wales. The specific epithet (alpina) is a Latin word meaning "of high mountains".

In New Zealand the species is known as Caladenia lyallii although "some orchidologists" suggest that both C. lyallii and C. alpina occur in that country. The epithet (lyallii) honours the Scottish botanist David Lyall, who was a friend of Joseph Hooker. Caladenia alpina is regarded as a synonym of Caladenia lyallii by the Royal Botanic Gardens, Kew. Caladenia lyallii was first formally described by Joseph Dalton Hooker in Flora Novae-Zelandiae.

Distribution and habitat
Alpine caladenia usually grows in subalpine zones above  in forest, Snow Gum woodland and herbfields or near ponds and bogs. In New South Wales it occurs on the Southern Tablelands south of the Brindabella Range and in Victoria on the Great Dividing Range and Grampians. In New Zealand, Caladenia lyallii occurs on both the North and South Islands as well as on Stewart Island.

References

alpina
Plants described in 1927
Orchids of New Zealand
Orchids of New South Wales
Orchids of Victoria (Australia)
Taxa named by Richard Sanders Rogers